
Gmina Czerwonka is a rural gmina (administrative district) in Maków County, Masovian Voivodeship, in east-central Poland.

Villages
Gmina Czerwonka contains the villages and settlements of Adamowo, Budzyno-Bolki, Budzyno-Lipniki, Budzyno-Walędzięta, Cieciórki Szlacheckie, Cieciórki Włościańskie, Ciemniewo, Czerwonka, Dąbrówka, Guty Duże, Guty Małe, Jankowo, Janopole, Kałęczyn, Krzyżewo-Jurki, Krzyżewo-Marki, Lipniki, Mariampole, Perzanowo, Ponikiew Wielka, Sewerynowo, Soje, Tłuszcz and Ulaski.

Neighbouring gminas
Gmina Czerwonka is bordered by the town of Maków Mazowiecki and by the gminas of Karniewo, Młynarze, Płoniawy-Bramura, Różan, Rzewnie, Sypniewo and Szelków.

References

External links
Polish official population figures 2006

Czerwonka
Maków County